William Franklin Butler (born March 12, 1947) is a former Major League Baseball pitcher who played for seven seasons. A left-hander, he pitched for the Kansas City Royals, Cleveland Indians, and the Minnesota Twins.

External links

Pura Pelota : VPBL pitching statistics

1947 births
Albuquerque Dukes players
Baseball players from Maryland
Cleveland Indians players
Daytona Beach Islanders players
Florida Instructional League Royals players
Florida Instructional League Tigers players
Kansas City Royals players
Leones del Caracas players
Living people
Major League Baseball pitchers
Minnesota Twins players
Montgomery Rebels players
Navegantes del Magallanes players
American expatriate baseball players in Venezuela
Omaha Royals players
People from Hyattsville, Maryland
Portland Beavers players
Rocky Mount Leafs players
Tacoma Twins players
Tigres de Aragua players